Joyce Moriku also called Joyce Kaducu (born 21 April 1969), is a Ugandan pediatrician, academic and politician. She is now state Minister for Primary education in the new cabinet starting 2021. Previously she was in the Minister of State for Primary Health Care in the Ugandan Cabinet. She was appointed to that position on 6 June 2016, replacing Sarah Achieng Opendi, who became State Minister for Health, General Duties. She also serves as the elected Member of Parliament for Moyo District Women Representative in the 10th Parliament (2016 to 2021).

Background and education
Dr. Moriku was born in Moyo District, West Nile sub-region, in the Northern Region of Uganda, on 21 April 1969. She attended Laropi Primary School for her elementary education. She studied at Metu Senior Secondary School, in Moyo, for her O-Level education, before she transferred to Sacred Heart Senior Secondary School in Gulu for her A-Level studies.

In 1997, she was admitted to Mbarara University School of Medicine to study Human Medicine, graduating with a Bachelor of Medicine and Bachelor of Surgery in 2002. In 2005 she received a Postgraduate Diploma in Project Planning and Management from Gulu University. She then entered Makerere University School of Medicine at Mulago, where she obtained the Master of Medicine in Pediatrics in 2008. Still later, in 2015, Gulu University awarded her a PhD in Neuroscience.

Medical career
Following her first degree, she interned at Lacor Hospital in Gulu, from 2002 until 2003. Between 2003 and 2005, she worked as the medical coordinator for The AIDS Support Organisation (TASO), based in Gulu. From 2005 until 2008, she worked as a Senior House Officer at Mulago National Referral Hospital. Following that, she worked as the Medical Director, for one year at Mildmay Clinic on Entebbe Road, from 2008 until 2009. From 2010 until 2015, she worked as a lecturer in pediatrics at Gulu University and concurrently served as a consultant pediatrician at Gulu Regional Referral Hospital.

Political career
In 2016, she entered elective politics by contesting for the Moyo District Women's Constituency. She won and is the incumbent in the 10th Parliament (2016 to 2021). On 6 June 2016, she was appointed State Minister for Primary Health Care.

Personal life
She is married to Professor Kaducu an academic at Gulu University.

See also
 Cabinet of Uganda
 Parliament of Uganda

References

Living people
1969 births
Ugandan pediatricians
Members of the Parliament of Uganda
Government ministers of Uganda
People from Moyo District
Gulu University alumni
Mbarara University alumni
Makerere University alumni
National Resistance Movement politicians
Women government ministers of Uganda
Women members of the Parliament of Uganda
21st-century Ugandan politicians
21st-century Ugandan women politicians